João Paulo dos Reis Veloso (12 July 1931, Parnaíba – 19 February 2019, Rio de Janeiro) was a Brazilian economist and politician who served as Minister of Planning between 1969 and 1979, and also as President of the Institute of Applied Economic Research.

References

1931 births
2019 deaths
People from Parnaíba
Government ministers of Brazil